Gunilla Svärd (born 26 March 1970) is a Swedish orienteering competitor. She is two times Relay World Champion as a member of the Swedish winning team in 1997 and 2004, as well as having silver medals from 2001 and 2003, and a bronze medal from 1999.  She obtained bronze in the Short distance World Championship in 2001. Svärd won in the Overall World Cup in 1996, and she has obtained three victories in individual World Cup races. She also has a gold medal from 2002 in the European Orienteering Championships (Middle distance), and more than twenty-five medals from the Swedish Championships.

References

External links
 
 

1970 births
Living people
Swedish orienteers
Female orienteers
Foot orienteers
World Orienteering Championships medalists
Junior World Orienteering Championships medalists